The A1173 is a Primary Route that runs from The A46 road in Caistor to the A160 road in Immingham. It is 11 miles long.

References

Roads in England